Brian Fairley (born 18 April 1959 in Falkirk) is a Scottish former association football manager.

His coaching career began at Whitburn Juniors before going on to manage Stenhousemuir, however after a dispute with the board over a signing he resigned in October 2001. He then took over at Scottish Junior club Bo'ness United, but controversially resigned on the eve of a Scottish Junior Cup semifinal in March 2003 to become the manager at Dumbarton, along with assistant Allan McGonigal. At the time Dumbarton were in relegation trouble in the Scottish Second Division, but with only 6 games to go of the season he turned fortunes around and kept the club in the league, including a 4-1 win over league winners Raith Rovers.

Fairley led the club to 3rd place in the same league the following season in his only full season in charge. Narrowly missing out on automatic promotion on the last day of the season to 2nd placed Hamilton Academical by 2 points. Dumbarton were unable to repeat that success the following season and Fairley resigned in December 2004.

He joined league rivals Forfar Athletic, and kept the Angus club in the Scottish Second Division at the end of season 2004-05 but resigned shortly into the next season citing work and family commitments.

In May 2008 he was appointed as manager of Linlithgow Rose. He resigned from his position at the end of February 2009 following a poor run of results.

Manager Statistics

References

External links
 Soccerbase managerial statistics

1959 births
Living people
Sportspeople from Falkirk
Scottish football managers
Dumbarton F.C. managers
Forfar Athletic F.C. managers
Stenhousemuir F.C. managers
Scottish Football League managers
Scottish Junior Football Association managers
Whitburn F.C. non-playing staff